The United States Lightship WLV-613 was a lightvessel commissioned in 1952 that became the last lightship to mark the Ambrose Channel. She was replaced by a Texas Tower lightstation on 24 August 1967.

The WLV-613 was reassigned as a relief ship on the  Massachusetts coastline from 1967–79. After being assigned in 1979 to Nantucket Shoals the lightship alternated with her sister ship, the Lightship WLV-612, relieving each other approximately every 21 days as the Nantucket lightship. The WLV-613 was also the last lightship to mark the Nantucket channel on 20 December 1983. She was decommissioned and retired in 1983.

WLV-613 was berthed at the Wareham Shipyard along Main Street in Wareham, Massachusetts from about 1990 until she was moved to New Bedford, Massachusetts on December 1, 2014.  The vessel (now painted as "NANTUCKET") is now privately owned by William B. Golden and Kristen Golden, owners of WLV-612 that also served as the Nantucket station lightship.  Currently, she is  located in New Bedford, MA but closed to the public.

Footnotes

References

External links
  Lightship Nantucket II WLV 613, MA

1952 ships
Lightships of the United States
Museum ships in Massachusetts